Empress Dowager Fu may refer to:

 Empress Fu (Ai) (傅昭儀, given name unknown) (died 1 BC), Chinese consort and empress dowager of the Han Dynasty
 Empress Dowager Fu (Later Zhou) (小符皇后, given name unknown) (died 993), second empress of Chai Rong of the Later Zhou dynasty

See also
 Empress Fu (disambiguation)

Fu